Kelsea Nicole Ballerini (born September 12, 1993) is an American country pop singer and songwriter. She began songwriting as a child and signed a contract with Black River Entertainment in 2014, releasing her debut studio album the following year, The First Time. Her second studio album, Unapologetically, followed in 2017. 

Ballerini's first two albums have accounted for seven charted songs on the Hot Country Songs and Country Airplay charts. She has five No. 1 singles on the latter, starting with her debut single "Love Me Like You Mean It", which made her the first female artist to send a debut single to the top of that chart since Carrie Underwood in 2006. It was followed by "Dibs" and "Peter Pan", whose peaks also made her the first female country artist to send her first three singles to the top of that chart since Wynonna Judd. Ballerini's fourth No. 1 single is "Legends". Her third studio album, Kelsea, and a counterpart acoustic album, Ballerini, were both released in 2020. Her fourth studio album, Subject to Change was released in 2022.

Early life
Ballerini (an only child) was raised in Knoxville, Tennessee by her father, Ed and her mother, Carla. Ed held a job as a sales manager for a country radio station and is of  Italian descent. Carla has worked in marketing for Thomas Nelson Bible publishing and a sponsorship company.Ballerini started taking dance lessons at Premiere Dance Studio in Seymour, Tennessee when she was three and quit ten years later. She also sang in the church and school choirs. She wrote her first song at 12 for her mother and moved to Nashville, Tennessee, three years later. She attended Central High School in Knoxville, Tennessee; Centennial High School in Franklin, Tennessee; and then Lipscomb University for two years until she pursued a musical career.

Career

2014–2016: Self-titled EP and The First Time

At 19, she signed a deal with Black River Entertainment. In late 2014, she released her debut single "Love Me Like You Mean It", which debuted on the Country Airplay chart in October 2014. She released a self-titled extended play for the label in November. She was named one of CMT's Next Women of Country in 2014. She performed for the first time at the Grand Ole Opry on February 14, 2015, and sang "Love Me Like You Mean It". On May 19, 2015, Ballerini's debut album The First Time was released through Black River. For the chart dated July 4, 2015, "Love Me Like You Mean It", the album's first single, reached number one on the Billboard Country Airplay chart, making Ballerini the first solo female country music artist to score a number one hit with her debut single since Carrie Underwood did so with "Jesus, Take the Wheel" in 2006, and only the eleventh in history to achieve the feat. Ballerini also became only the fifth solo female country music artist to score back-to-back number one hits with her first two singles when "Dibs" reached the top of the Country Airplay chart and the first to do it since Jamie O'Neal in 2001.
The album's third single, "Peter Pan", was released to country radio on March 21, 2016. "Peter Pan" reached number one on both the Country Airplay and Hot Country Songs charts in September, making Ballerini the first solo female country music artist to top both country music charts simultaneously. This achievement also made her the first solo female to send her first three singles to number one since Wynonna Judd accomplished the same feat in 1992. The album's fourth single, "Yeah Boy", was released to country radio on October 10, 2016.

2017–2019: Unapologetically, coaching The Voice, and joining the Grand Ole Opry

In early 2017, Ballerini was named to Forbes' 30 Under 30 – Music list at number two. In 2017, Ballerini received two Academy of Country Music Award nominations for Female Vocalist of the Year and Video of the Year for "Peter Pan." In June 2017, Ballerini released "Legends" as the first single from her second studio album. On November 3, she released her second album, titled Unapologetically. The album debuted at number three on the Billboard Top Country Album Chart and number seven on the Billboard 200 Album Chart, making it her highest charting album on both charts.

The second single from the album, "I Hate Love Songs", was released in March. In September 2018, she announced that she would be releasing a deluxe edition of the album with four new tracks. On September 18, 2018, EDM-pop duo The Chainsmokers released a song titled "This Feeling" featuring Ballerini, which later performed at the 2018 Victoria's Secret Fashion Show in November. The third and final single from Unapologetically, "Miss Me More", was released in October 2018. In October, she provided vocals on her husband Morgan Evans' song "Dance With Me". Ballerini joined the 15th season of The Voice as the fifth coach. She coached six contestants who did not get a chair turn during The Blinds, in a new round called The Comeback Stage. The Comeback Stage was a digital companion series to the show. In October 2018, Ballerini released the song "We Were Like". In December 2018, Unapologetically received a nomination for Best Country Album at the 61st annual Grammy Awards.

On March 5, 2019, Ballerini was invited by Little Big Town to become a member of the Grand Ole Opry. On April 16, 2019, she was inducted into the Grand Ole Opry by Carrie Underwood. Ballerini embarked on the Miss Me More Tour in support of Unapologetically in April 2019. The tour was a success, with Ballerini selling out multiple dates. In June 2019, Ballerini was a guest on the NBC competition show Songland and released the song "Better Luck Next Time".

2019–2021: Kelsea and Ballerini

In July 2019, Ballerini confirmed in an Instagram post that work on her third studio album was complete. On September 6, 2019, Ballerini released the first single off of her then upcoming third album, titled "Homecoming Queen?" The song debuted at number 22 on the Country Airplay chart, making it Ballerini's highest debut on the chart to date. On November 8, Ballerini released the promotional single "Club". Ballerini confirmed on January 20, 2020, that the album is self-titled (Kelsea) and was released March 20, 2020. The announcement coincided with the release of a second promotional single, "LA". On February 28, she released the single "Hole in the Bottle" (stylized in all lowercase) and announced the tracklist for Kelsea including "Half of my Hometown" featuring Kenny Chesney and "The Other Girl" featuring Halsey.

On September 2, Ballerini announced she would be releasing a counterpart album to Kelsea, titled Ballerini, featuring stripped-down versions of the songs. It was released September 11, 2020.  The stripped-down version of "Club" was released alongside the album announcement. She described Ballerini as "emotional, vulnerable and soft" while Kelsea showed her "bold and effervescent" side. As of October 16, 2020, Kelsea and Ballerini can be purchased physically as a double album, exclusively from Target.

In 2021, Ballerini temporarily filled in for Kelly Clarkson as a coach during Season 20 of The Voice. She co-hosted the 2021 CMT Music Awards with Kane Brown, where she won the award for CMT Performance of the Year. In May, it was announced she would be an opening act on the Jonas Brothers' Remember This tour which began in August. Her debut book of poetry, Feel Your Way Through, was released on November 16, 2021.

2022–2023: Subject to Change and Rolling Up the Welcome Mat
In March 2022 Ballerini announced that "Heartfirst" would be released April 8, 2022. The song serves as the first single from her fourth studio album, Subject to Change. While co-hosting during the 2022 CMT Music Awards, Ballerini performed the song for the very first time. The music video for the song premiered July 7, 2022. On July 15, 2022, a promotional single, "Love is a Cowboy" was released along with the official music video. The album features a collaboration, "You're Drunk, Go Home", with Kelly Clarkson and Carly Pearce. The album was released on September 23, 2022. In November 2022, "Heartfirst" was nominated for Best Country Solo Performance at the 65th Annual Grammy Awards. On December 5, 2022, "If You Go Down (I'm Goin' Down Too)", was released as the album's second single.

On February 13, 2023, Ballerini announced that her short film and EP Rolling Up the Welcome Mat would be released the following day.  To promote the EP, she performed "Blindsided" and "Penthouse" on the March 5, 2023 episode of Saturday Night Live.

Influences
Ballerini has been influenced by artists in both the pop music and country music fields. Originally influenced by pop music, Ballerini states "I grew up on top 40 pop. I didn't know what country music was, which is so funny because I grew up on a farm in East Tennessee." Ballerini lists Britney Spears, Christina Aguilera, NSYNC, and Hilary Duff among these early artists influencing her. Ballerini also cites Justin Bieber as an early pop musical inspiration. It was not until Ballerini heard "Stupid Boy" by Keith Urban that she decided to delve deeper into country music by listening to albums by Taylor Swift, Sugarland, and Dixie Chicks. She credited Swift's self-titled debut studio album for introducing her to country music. Ballerini also cites Shania Twain as her greatest influence. She has also performed songs originally recorded by Alison Krauss and sang "Ghost in This House" alongside Krauss at the CMT Artists of the Year Awards in 2018.

Personal life

In March 2016, Ballerini began dating Australian country singer Morgan Evans. They became engaged on Christmas Day 2016 and were married on December 2, 2017, in Cabo San Lucas, Mexico. On August 29, 2022, Ballerini announced that she and Evans were divorcing. On November 3, 2022, it was revealed that Ballerini and Evans had reached a settlement agreement and their divorce was finalized on November 15, 2022.

In February 2023, it was confirmed that Ballerini was dating Outer Banks actor Chase Stokes. The couple reportedly began dating in December 2022. 

Ballerini was a student at Central High School during the 2008 shooting, which she witnessed. She has said she suffers from PTSD due to the experience.

Discography

Studio albums
 The First Time (2015)
 Unapologetically (2017)
 Kelsea (2020)
 Subject to Change (2022)

Awards and nominations

Tours
Headlining
The First Time Tour (2016)
The Unapologetically Tour (2018)
The Miss Me More Tour (2019)
Heartfirst Tour (2022-2023)

Supporting
Wheels Up Tour (2015) with Lady A
 Just the Right Kind of Crazy Tour (2015) with Dan + Shay
Rhythm and Roots Tour (2016) with Rascal Flatts
Home Team Tour (2017) with Thomas Rhett
You Look Good World Tour (2017) with Lady A
 Graffiti U World Tour (2018) with Keith Urban
Meaning of Life Tour (2019) with Kelly Clarkson
Remember This Tour (2021) with Jonas Brothers

Television appearances

Bibliography
 Ballerini, Kelsea (2021). Feel Your Way Through: A Book of Poetry. Ballantine Books.

References

External links 
 
 

1993 births
American women country singers
American country singer-songwriters
American people of Italian descent
Black River Entertainment artists
Country musicians from Tennessee
Country pop musicians
Lipscomb University alumni
Living people
Musicians from Knoxville, Tennessee
Singer-songwriters from Tennessee
People from Knox County, Tennessee
21st-century American women singers
Grand Ole Opry members